C. V. Padmarajan (born 22 July 1931) is an Indian politician and advocate from Paravur, Kollam, Kerala, India. He was a minister in the Kerala Government, holding various portfolios including Finance, Electricity, Community Development, and Fisheries. He was also the Kerala Pradesh Congress Committee President in 1983-1987 period.

Early life
Padmarajan was born at Paravur in the erstwhile Kingdom of Travancore on 22 July 1931 as the son of K. Velu Vaidyar and K. M. Thankamma. He started his political life through All Travancore Student's Congress during the freedom struggle. He started his professional career as a teacher and later he took graduation on Law. He was appointed District Government Pleader and Public Prosecutor in Quilon during 1973–79. He married R. Vasantha Kumari and has 2 Sons.

Assembly election candidature history

References

External links

Padmarajan, C.V.
Malayali politicians
People from Kollam district
Indian National Congress politicians from Kerala
Kerala MLAs 1991–1996
Kerala MLAs 1982–1987
State cabinet ministers of Kerala
1931 births